Thana means "police station" in South Asian countries and is an administrative unit.

Thana may also refer to:

Thana, Malakand, Pakistan
Thana, Kannur, India
Thane, known as Thana until 1996, Maharashtra, India
Thane district
Thana Bhawan, also known simply as Thana, town in Uttar Pradesh, India

See also

Thane (disambiguation)
Thaana, the writing system of the Maldivian language